Rachicerus fulvicollis is a species of fly in the family Xylophagidae.

Distribution
United States.

References

Xylophagidae
Insects described in 1854
Taxa named by Francis Walker (entomologist)
Diptera of North America